Fibroblast growth factor 2, also known as basic fibroblast growth factor (bFGF) and FGF-β, is a growth factor and signaling protein encoded by the FGF2 gene. It binds to and exerts effects via specific fibroblast growth factor receptor  (FGFR) proteins, themselves a family of closely related molecules. Fibroblast growth factor protein was first purified in 1975; soon thereafter three variants were isolated: 'basic FGF' (FGF2); Heparin-binding growth factor-2; and Endothelial cell growth factor-2. Gene sequencing revealed that this group is the same FGF2 protein and is a member of a family of FGF proteins.

Function 
Like other FGF family members, basic fibroblast growth factor possess broad mitogenic and cell survival activities, and is involved in a variety of biological processes, including embryonic development, cell growth, morphogenesis, tissue repair, tumor growth and invasion. 

In normal tissue, bFGF is present in basement membranes and in the subendothelial extracellular matrix of blood vessels.  It stays membrane-bound as long as there is no signal peptide.

It has been hypothesized that, during both wound healing of normal tissues and tumor development, the action of heparan sulfate-degrading enzymes activates bFGF, thus mediating the formation of new blood vessels, a process known as angiogenesis.

In addition, it is synthesized and secreted by human adipocytes and the concentration of FGF2 correlates with the BMI in blood samples. It was also shown to act on preosteoblasts – in the form of an increased proliferation – after binding to fibroblast growth factor receptor 1 and activating phosphoinositide 3-kinase.

FGF2 has been shown in preliminary animal studies to protect the heart from injury associated with a heart attack, reducing tissue death and promoting improved function after reperfusion.

Recent evidence has shown that low levels of FGF2 play a key role in the incidence of excessive anxiety.

Additionally, FGF2 is a critical component of human embryonic stem cell culture medium; the growth factor is necessary for the cells to remain in an undifferentiated state, although the mechanisms by which it does this are poorly defined. It has been demonstrated to induce gremlin expression which in turn is known to inhibit the induction of differentiation by bone morphogenetic proteins. It is necessary in mouse-feeder cell dependent culture systems, as well as in feeder and serum-free culture systems. FGF2, in conjunction with BMP4, promote differentiation of stem cells to mesodermal lineages.  After differentiation, BMP4 and FGF2 treated cells generally produce higher amounts of osteogenic and chondrogenic differentiation than untreated stem cells. However, a low concentration of bFGF (10 ng/mL) may exert an inhibitory effect on osteoblast differentiation. The nuclear form of FGF2 functions in mRNA export

FGF2 is synthesized primarily as a 155 amino acid polypeptide, resulting in an 18 kDa protein.  However, there are four alternate start codons which provide N-terminal extensions of 41, 46, 55, or 133 amino acids, resulting in proteins of 22 kDa (196 aa total), 22.5 kDa (201 aa total), 24 kDa (210 aa total) and 34 kDa (288 aa total), respectively.  Generally, the 155 aa/18 kDa low molecular weight (LMW) form is considered cytoplasmic and can be secreted from the cell, whereas the high molecular weight (HMW) forms are directed to the cell's nucleus.

Interactions 

Basic fibroblast growth factor has been shown to interact with casein kinase 2, alpha 1, RPL6, ribosomal protein S19 and API5.

See also 
 Angiogenesis
 Anxiety disorders
 Cytokine
 Fibroblast growth factor
 Growth factor
 Proteases in angiogenesis
 Receptor (biochemistry)
 Signal transduction

References

Further reading

External links 
 
 

Growth factors

de:Wachstumsfaktor
es:Factor de crecimiento